KGI is an acronym for:

 Keck Graduate Institute
 Kernel Graphics Interface
Knight Global Investments

KGI may also refer to:

 Kalgoorlie-Boulder Airport, IATA airport code